Everybody is a play written by Branden Jacobs-Jenkins. It is a modern adaptation of the 15th-century morality play Everyman, one of the first recorded plays in the English language. The play premiered Off-Broadway at the Irene Diamond Stage at Signature Theatre Company on February 21, 2017 with previews beginning January 31, 2017 and a closing date of March 19, 2017. The play features the unique casting quirk of using a lottery system to define the roles of the play. Each actor must memorize the entire script and be prepared to play any role. This is meant to symbolize the randomness of death. The original production was directed by Lila Neugebauer and featured an ensemble of nine performers.

Plot
The story is kept largely the same as Everyman with a few exceptions. Fellowship, Kindred, Goods, Discretion, Five Wits, and Knowledge are renamed Friendship, Kinship, Stuff, Mind, Five Senses, and Understanding respectively. Additionally the scene where Everyman must whip himself for Confession is changed to a scene where they are instructed by the drill seargant-esque Love to strip naked and shout about existential dread. Also instead of Good Deeds following Everyman/Everybody to the grave, in this play that role is filled by Love. The story is also interspersed with pre-recorded voiceover scenes done fully in the dark, depicting four of Everybody's friends comforting them at their deathbed and through a misunderstanding eventually turns into a discussion on racism.

Cast and characters

Reception
Ben Brantley of The New York Times gave the show a lukewarm review, saying that the concept was interesting and it had value as an acting exercise, but claimed that the show was "saying what is essentially the same thing again and again and again" and that the pre-recorded sections felt like "unnecessary afterthoughts." Marilyn Stasio of Variety said "Something is inevitably lost in adapting the material for a modern audience that has outgrown its fear and awe of hellfire and damnation. But the story retains some power on a human level, and Jacobs-Jenkins plays up the randomness of death and the universality of the human condition by casting most of the major roles in this show by lottery at each performance."

Awards and nominations

Original Off-Broadway production

References

2017 plays
Off-Broadway plays
Metafiction
Plays based on other plays
Existentialist plays
Everyman